The 1983–84 Navy Midshipmen men's basketball team represented the United States Naval Academy during the 1983–84 NCAA Division I men's basketball season. The Midshipmen were led by fourth-year head coach Paul Evans, and played their home games at Halsey Field House in Annapolis, Maryland as members of the ECAC South.

Roster

Schedule and results

|-
!colspan=9 style=| Non-conference regular season

|-
!colspan=9 style=| ECAC South regular season

|-
!colspan=9 style=| ECAC South tournament

Source

References

Navy Midshipmen
Navy Midshipmen men's basketball seasons
Navy
Navy